Dr. Pomerantz is a 2011 Israeli film directed by and starring Assi Dayan. It premiered in 2011 at the 27th Haifa International Film Festival and was theatrically released in Israel on February 23, 2012. The film was nominated for Best Screenplay at the Ophir Awards in September 2012. The film became Dayan's final as a director as well as an actor, before his death in May 2014.

In the film, Dayan plays a clinical psychologist named Dr. Yoel Pomerantz. Pomerantz's life is one big mess, both personally and professionally. His wife committed suicide because she thought their 5-year-old son was intellectually disabled. The son, Yoav (Michael Hanegbi), who is now 30 years old, actually has Asperger syndrome. He works as a traffic inspector and more than anything else, loves to affix traffic tickets to car windshields.

The film was met with mostly favorable reviews, though did very poor business at the Israeli Box office. The film initially remained unreleased on DVD, and was only available through VOD. But shortly after Dayan's death, the film saw a first DVD release in June 2014.

Cast
 Assi Dayan – Dr. Yoel Pomerantz
  – Yoav Pomerantz
 Rivka Michaeli – Rebecca Zimmer
  – Izhak Bar-Ner
 Gavri Banai – Himself
 Shlomo Bar-Shavit – Vladek Nusbaum
 Shmil Ben Ari – Yossi Sherman

References

External links
 

Films about autism
2010s Hebrew-language films
Israeli drama films
2011 films
Films directed by Assi Dayan